Forest partridges (Xenoperdix sp.) are partridges, described only in 1994, consists of two species of African partridges that are most closely related to Southeast Asian hill partridges.

Both species have boldly barred plumage and a red bill. Xenoperdix are found only in forests of the Udzungwa Mountains and the Rubeho Highlands of Tanzania. While the genus was previously believed to be monotypic (only containing Xenoperdix udzungwensis), the Rubeho population was recognized as a distinct species following a review of its molecular and morphological characteristics.

Species
 Rubeho forest partridge, Xenoperdix obscuratus
 Udzungwa forest partridge, Xenoperdix udzungwensis

References
Dinesen, L., Lehmberg, T., Svendsen, J.O., Hansen, L.A., Fjeldså, J. 1994. A new genus and species of perdicine bird (Phasianidae, Perdicini) from Tanzania; a relict form with Indo-Malayan affinities. Ibis 136: 2-11.

 
Bird genera